Composia fidelissima the faithful beauty or Uncle Sam moth is a moth in the family Erebidae. The species was first described by Gottlieb August Wilhelm Herrich-Schäffer in 1866. It is found in southern Florida and the West Indies, including Cuba.

The wingspan is 48–64 mm. Adults are on wing year round. They are day flying.

The larvae feed on Cynanchum scoparium, Canavalia (including Canavalia rosea), Nerium (including Nerium oleander) and Echites species (including Echites umbellatus).

Subspecies
Composia fidelissima fidelissima
Composia fidelissima vagrans Bates, 1933

References

Moths described in 1866
Composia